Avio Design is a Bulgarian aircraft manufacturer based in Vetrino. The company specializes in the design and manufacture of ultralight trikes and powered parachutes.

The company markets a range of single and two-seat trikes for recreational, flight training, forestry and agricultural aircraft applications, including the provision of ultra-low volume spray equipment.

Aircraft

References

External links

Aircraft manufacturers of Bulgaria
Ultralight trikes
Powered parachutes
Homebuilt aircraft
Kazanlak